Thatcheria mirabilis, common name the Japanese wonder shell or Miraculous thatcheria is a species of sea snail, a marine gastropod mollusk in the family Raphitomidae.

Description
The length of the shell varies between 70 mm and 120 mm.

(Original description) The solid shell is angularly pyriform and yellowish white. The spire is elevated and acuminate towards the apex. It contains 8 whorls, flattened, and slightly excavated above, strongly and prominently keeled at the periphery, and sloping inwards below. Above the keels they are finely arcuately striate, below irregularly more or less crenately concentrically ridged. The aperture is triangularly subquadrate, pure white, and shining within. The white columella is smooth, slightly arcuate above, nearly straight below. The outer lip shows a broad excavated sinus extending from its juncture with the body whorl to the extremity of the last keel. Below the keel, which is very prominent, the lip is simple and arcuate.

Distribution
This marine species occurs in the Indo-West Pacific and also off Japan and Western Australia; also as fossils, range: Upper Miocene to Recent (mainly Pliocene)

References

 Kuroda, T. & Habe, T. 1954. New genera of Japanese marine gastropods. Venus 18(2): 84-97, text figs 1-20
 Powell, A.W.B. 1966. The molluscan families Speightiidae and Turridae, an evaluation of the valid taxa, both Recent and fossil, with list of characteristic species. Bulletin of the Auckland Institute and Museum. Auckland, New Zealand 5: 1–184, pls 1–23
 Powell, A.W.B. 1968. The turrid shellfish of Australian waters. Australian Natural History 1 16: 1–6
 Rosenberg, G. 1992. Encyclopedia of Seashells. Dorset: New York. 224 pp.
 Wilson, B. 1994. Australian marine shells. Prosobranch gastropods. Kallaroo, WA : Odyssey Publishing Vol. 2 370 pp.

External links
 
 Gastropods.com: Thatcheria mirabilis

mirabilis
Gastropods described in 1877